Terminal Building may refer to:

in the United States
(by state then city)
Terminal Building (Coffeyville, Kansas), listed on the NRHP in Montgomery County
Terminal Building, Old, Hangar and Powerhouse at Key Field, Meridian, Mississippi, listed on the NRHP in Lauderdale County
Terminal Building (Lincoln, Nebraska), listed on the NRHP in Lancaster County
Terminal Building (Rochester, New York), listed on the NRHP in Monroe County
Terminal Building (Oklahoma City, Oklahoma), home of architects Tonini & Bramblet